Desmethylchlorotrianisene (DMCTA) is a nonsteroidal estrogen which is thought to be the major active metabolite of chlorotrianisene (CTA; TACE). It is a 1:1 mixture of cis and trans isomers. DMCTA is produced from CTA via mono-O-demethylation catalyzed by cytochrome P450 enzymes in the liver. CTA is thought to act as a long-lasting prodrug of DMCTA.

References

Abandoned drugs
Human drug metabolites
Organochlorides
Phenol ethers
Selective estrogen receptor modulators
Synthetic estrogens
Triphenylethylenes